Tarrah-e Do (also Romanized as Ţarrāḩ-e Do; also known as Mollā Jāber and Ţarrāḩ-e Mollā ‘Abūdī-ye Yek) is a village in Tarrah Rural District, Hamidiyeh District, Ahvaz County, Khuzestan Province, Iran. At the 2006 census, its population was 233, in 38 families.

References 

Populated places in Ahvaz County